Frank Levingston (November 13, 1905 – May 3, 2016) was an American supercentenarian, who was the 2nd oldest military veteran in the United States. He was the oldest living man in the United States and the oldest verified surviving American veteran of World War II until his death in 2016.

He was born in Cotton Valley, Louisiana, one of seven children. He was of African American heritage. Levingston enlisted in the U.S. Army in 1942. He served as a private during the war in the Allied invasion of Italy which lasted from September 1943 to January 1944. After receiving an honorable discharge in 1945, he became a union worker specializing in cement finishing. Levingston never married. On August 16, 2015, he became the oldest recognized living military veteran in United States, following the death of Emma Didlake.

Levingston became the oldest living American man on April 19, 2016, following the death of fellow Louisianan Felix Simoneaux Jr. (born May 24, 1905). He lived in Calcasieu Parish, Lake Charles, Louisiana until his death in May 2016 at the age of 110.

References

1905 births
2016 deaths
United States Army personnel of World War II
African-American centenarians
American supercentenarians
Men supercentenarians
People from Lake Charles, Louisiana
People from Cotton Valley, Louisiana
Military personnel from Louisiana
United States Army soldiers
20th-century African-American people